Lake Kanim is a set of small freshwater lakes located on a clif of the south skirt of Lennox Mountain, in King County, Washington. Lake Kanim is the nascent source of the North Fork of the Snoqualmie River. The lake and its accompanying waterfall were named after Jerry Kanim who was the leader of Snoqualmie people.

Location 
Lake Kanim sits in a bowl formed by a ridge that connects Lennox Mountain and Canoe Peak. Shortly after the outflow, the river plunges into  Kanim Falls, the biggest waterfall of the North Fork Snoqualmie River. Bear Lakes and Bear Creek is a short distance south over Canoe Peak, while Coney Lake is to the east and Paradise Lakes, at the foot of Bare Mountain, is to the west of Lake Kanim.

Mining 
Lake Kanim is located in a prominent mining location. South of the lake, East of Canoe Peak is the Brooklyn claims. The mine is just above the Coney Mine on a ridge dividing the Miller River and the North Fork of the Snoqualmie River. The mine had two veins, 25' and 10' wide, with paystreaks 2'-4' wide. The Brooklyn claim on Money Creek is nearby. The ore reported includes chalcopyrites and pyrites.

See also 
 List of lakes of the Alpine Lakes Wilderness

References 

Lakes of King County, Washington
Lakes of the Alpine Lakes Wilderness
Okanogan National Forest